To slalom is to zigzag between obstacles. It may refer to:

Sports
Alpine skiing and/or snowboarding
 Slalom skiing, an alpine skiing and alpine snowboarding discipline
 Giant slalom, an alpine skiing and alpine snowboarding discipline
 Super-G or Super Giant Slalom, a racing discipline of alpine skiing

Other
 Autoslalom or autocross, for automobiles
 Canoe slalom, for kayak or canoe, formerly known as whitewater slalom
 Dual slalom, for mountain bikes
 Freestyle slalom skating, roller skating that involves performing tricks around a line of cones
 Slalom skateboarding, a form of downhill skateboard racing 
 Slalom waterskiing, a surface water sport

Other
 Slalom (video game), 1987 Nintendo skiing game
 Slalom (1965 film), an Italian film
 Slalom (2020 film), a Franco-Belgian film
 Slalom Consulting, a business and technology consulting firm
 Slalom (album), an album by Jane Ira Bloom